In the Nick of Time is a 1911 Australian silent film directed by Alfred Rolfe. It was described as a "sensational railway drama", although now is considered a lost film. It featured a fight on the footboard of a train.

Plot
The film featured two main sequences:
the ride for life
a murderous fight on the footboard of the train

Reception
One critic called it "easily the best of the A.P.P. Company's many brilliant dramatic productions."

References

External links
 
In the Nick of Time at AustLit

1911 films
Australian black-and-white films
Australian silent short films
Lost Australian films
Films directed by Alfred Rolfe